Microprofessor III (MPF III), introduced in 1983, was Multitech's (later renamed Acer) third branded computer product and also (arguably) one of the first Apple IIe clones. Unlike the two earlier computers, its design was influenced by the IBM personal computer. Because of some additional functions in the ROM and different graphics routines, the MPF III was not totally compatible with the original Apple IIe computer.

One key feature of the MPF III in some models was its Chinese BASIC, a version of Chinese-localized BASIC based on Applesoft BASIC.

The MPF III included an optional Z80 CP/M emulator card. It permitted the computer to switch to the Z80 processor and run programs developed under the CP/M operating system.

The different models in the MPF-III brand were the Multitech MPF-III/311 in NTSC countries (mainly in the United States and Canada) and the MPF-III/312 in PAL countries (mainly in Australia, Sweden, Spain, Finland, Italy and Singapore). It was also sold in Latin America as the Latindata MPF-III.

Technical specifications
 CPU: MOS Technology 6502, 1 MHz
 Memory (RAM): 64KB dynamic RAM and 2KB static RAM
 ROM: 24KB, including MBASIC (MPF-III BASIC), monitor, sound, display and printer programs and drivers
 Operating system: DOS 3.3 or ProDOS
 Input/Output: NTSC composite video jack (MPF-III/311), TV RF modulator port, cassette port, printer port, joystick 9-pin D-type port, earphone, and external speaker jacks
 Expandability: internal slots (6), optional Z80 CP/M emulator card, one external Apple II type card slot
 Screen display:
 Text modes: 40×24, 80x24 (with 80 columns card)
 Graphics modes: 40×48 (16 col), 280×192 (6 col)
 Sound: one channel
 Storage: 2 optional 5.25 inch 140 KB diskette drives
 Keyboard: 90 keys keyboard with numeric keypad

See also 
 Microprofessor I — unrelated Z80 programming education device
 Microprofessor II

External links 
 MPF III at the Old Computer Museum
 MPF III at the Silicium Museum 
 MPF III at the ZONADEPRUEBAS 

Acer Inc. computers
Home computers
Apple II clones